The Confederate Monument is a historic monument in Jackson, Mississippi, United States.

History
The monument features a soldier standing on top of an obelisk. It was built in 1891, and its dedication was attended by many veterans of the Confederate States Army. It has been listed on the National Register of Historic Places as a contributing property to the Old Capitol since November 25, 1969.

See also
 List of Confederate monuments and memorials

References

1891 sculptures
1891 establishments in Mississippi
Buildings and structures completed in 1891
Confederate States of America monuments and memorials in Mississippi
Monuments and memorials on the National Register of Historic Places in Mississippi
Outdoor sculptures in Mississippi
Sculptures of men in Mississippi
Statues in Mississippi
National Register of Historic Places in Jackson, Mississippi